Herpetogramma agavealis is a moth in the family Crambidae. It was described by Francis Walker in 1859. It is found in the Dominican Republic, Jamaica and Costa Rica.

References

Moths described in 1859
Herpetogramma
Moths of the Caribbean